Ottu (titled Rendagam in Tamil) is a 2022 Indian Malayalam-language action thriller film written and directed by Fellini T. P., shot simultaneously in Malayalam and Tamil languages. It was produced by August Cinema and The Show People. The film stars Kunchacko Boban and Aravind Swamy  along with Jackie Shroff, Eesha Rebba. The Malayalam version was released theatrically on 8 September 2022 while the Tamil version was released on 23 September 2022.

Plot
The film starts with Kichu, a happy-go-lucky guy who wishes to move outside the country with his girlfriend Kalyani. With the help of his father Chachan, Kichu receives a suspicious mission from a group of people who are willing to pay Kichu money to befriend a lonely man. They reveal that the lonely man is David, a gangster who lost his memory in a shootout at Udupi with confidential information about Rs. 30 crore worth gold. Kichu accepts the offer and proceeds to find David and befriend him. He eventually finds David working as a popcorn seller in a movie theatre. Kichu awkwardly approaches David in many ways and finally succeeds in becoming friends with him and starts calling David "Anna(brother)". The gang forces Kichu to make David regain his memory. Kichu plans a road trip with David by convincing David that he has to deliver a car consignment to Udupi. David reluctantly agrees and they start the trip. On the way from Mumbai to Udupi, they drop down at Goa to chill and end up in an intense fight with some drunkard who gets beaten up by a drunk David. After the fight, David and Kichu sit at the beach at night and drunk Kichu reveals his true intentions without any senses, to which David gets surprised and starts to suspect Kichu in every way. Finally David confronts Kichu and asks him about David. Kichu lies to him saying that he had heard from a friend. David keeps asking Kichu to make him talk to the friend as David feels like he is missing something. Finally, Kichu reveals that David was the ferocious gangster who was the right hand to his boss Asainar. 

David surprisingly reveals that he isn't David but his boss Asainar. Kichu shocked to hear this gets out of the car and contacts the gang and they admit that it is in fact Asainar with Kichu in the car and offers Kichu 10 lakhs more if he takes Asainar to the shootout spot in Udupi. They finally reach Udupi at the shootout spot and Kichu goes outside the compound to get 2 teas but the teaseller lady already keeps 2 teas ready for them and hands it over. Kichu afraid of Asainar offers him the tea and asks him if he remembered anything from the incident. Asainar says no and asks Kichu in return if he remembered anything addressing him by the name "Dawood (David)". Kichu gets confused by Asainar calling him Dawood and finally Asainar reveals that it is Kichu who is actually David or Dawood and it is he who lost his memory all this time. Kichu doesnt want to believe all this and the gang arrive at the location and they stand in support of Asainar instead of Kichu. Kichu gets confused and suddenly notices his father Chachan dressed up with the gang along with Kalyani. Shocked to see his whole life ending up as a lie. Asainar questions him on why David betrayed Asainar during the incident, to which Kichu cannot remember anything and breaks down. 

Asainar and gang takes Kichu along with them to another enemy named Adiga. They arrive at Adiga's place and shoots down everyone at his bungalow and finds Adiga at the beach who recognizes everyone including Kichu/David. He recollects everything from their origin stories in the past and finally expresses his anger towards Asainar. Asainar kills Adiga and takes Kichu to a silent location nearby. Asainar realizes that Kichu cannot remember being David and considers him of no use and leaves Kichu. Before leaving Kichu asks what David used to call Asainar. Asainar responds "Annan” (brother) and indicates to Kalyani to finish him off after he leaves. Kalyani takes the gun and holds him at the gunpoint. Kichu finally asks if he is really David to which Kalyani nods. In his final moments, Kichu recollects telling Kalyani, when he thought Asainar was actually David, that if David realizes that he is David to even a small extent no one around him can even think about touching him. During the final moment, Kichu suddenly transforms into David and fights back killing everyone except Kalyani, David hugs Kalyani and kisses her but ends up killing her at that moment confirming that Kichu has actually turned into David. David takes a van and sits to realize a promise he had once given to Asaianar's wife that he will kill Asainar once and for all and David sets on the path to hunt Asainar down while Asainar is arrogantly confident that no one can stop him, indicating that the story will continue.

Cast
 Arvind Swamy as  Assainar / David
 Kunchacko Boban as Kichu / David
 Jackie Shroff as Adiga
 Eesha Rebba as Kalyani 
 Jins Baskar
 Aneesh Gopal
 Aadukalam Naren as Chacha
 Siyad Yadu
 Amalda Liz

Production
The film was to mark Kunchacko Boban's first film in Tamil cinema, and also marks Arvind Swamy's comeback to Malayalam cinema after Devaraagam. On 17 March 2021, it was announced that Telugu actress Eesha Rebba would be playing the female lead opposite Boban which marks her debut in both Malayalam and Tamil cinema. The film was produced by actor Arya under the production banner August Cinema and The Show People. On 19 September 2021, the shooting of the film was wrapped.

Music 

The film's music was composed by Arulraj Kennady.

Release
The film was released theatrically on 8 September 2022. The film was originally scheduled for release on 2 September 2022 but due to censor issues of the Tamil version the release date was postponed. The teaser of the film was released on 3 January 2022.

Reception
Anna M. M. Vetticad of Firstpost gave the film 1.5 out of 5 stars and wrote, “Ottu has a premise with potential but starts sputtering early on in the absence of a worthwhile script. It picks up in fits and starts, but the engine dies on it long before the final scene.”  Sajin Srijith of Cinema Express gave the film 2 out of 5 stars and wrote "The choreography of the film is straight out of a bad B-movie." A critic from Asianet News wrote after reviewing the film that "Ottu is a film that gives a different experience in the recent action thrillers in Malayalam in terms of background and presentation." A critic for The News Minute rated the film 2 out of 5 stars and wrote "Ottu – meaning betrayal – gives you the feeling that more than a particular character in the film, it is you, the audience, who were taken for a ride." S. R. Praveen of The Hindu wrote after reviewing the film that "The way Ottu proceeds does not make one excited enough for the promised prequel and the sequel."

The Tamil version of the film received negative reviews.

References

External links

2022 films
2020s Malayalam-language films
2020s Tamil-language films